The 2020–21 season was the 111th season of competitive football in Germany.

Promotion and relegation

Pre-season

Post-season

National teams

Germany national football team

Kits

2020–21 UEFA Nations League

2020–21 UEFA Nations League A Group 4

2020–21 UEFA Nations League fixtures and results

UEFA Euro 2020

UEFA Euro 2020 Group F

UEFA Euro 2020 fixtures and results

2022 FIFA World Cup qualification

2022 FIFA World Cup qualification Group J

2022 FIFA World Cup qualification fixtures and results

Friendly matches

Germany Olympic football team

Summer Olympics

Due to the COVID-19 pandemic, the games have been postponed to the summer of 2021, from 22 July to 7 August. However, their official name remains 2020 Summer Olympics.

Germany women's national football team

UEFA Women's Euro 2022 qualifying

UEFA Women's Euro 2022 qualifying Group I

UEFA Women's Euro 2021 qualifying fixtures and results

Friendly matches

League season

Men

Bundesliga

Bundesliga standings

2. Bundesliga

2. Bundesliga standings

3. Liga

3. Liga standings

DFB-Pokal

Final

DFL-Supercup

Women

Frauen-Bundesliga

Frauen-Bundesliga standings

2. Frauen-Bundesliga

2. Frauen-Bundesliga North standings

2. Frauen-Bundesliga South standings

DFB-Pokal Frauen

Final

German clubs in Europe

UEFA Super Cup

UEFA Champions League

Group stage

Group A

Group B

Group F

Group H

Knockout phase

Round of 16

|}

Quarter-finals

|}

UEFA Europa League

Qualifying phase and play-off round

Second qualifying round

|}

Third qualifying round

|}

Play-off round

|}

Group stage

Group C

Group L

Knockout phase

Round of 32

|}

UEFA Women's Champions League

Knockout phase

Round of 32

|}

Round of 16

|}

Quarter-finals

|}

Semi-finals

|}

Notes

References

 
Seasons in German football